Will Friedwald (born September 16, 
1961) is an American author and music critic. He has written for newspapers that include the Wall Street Journal, New York Times, Village Voice, Newsday, New York Observer, and New York Sun – and for magazines that include Entertainment Weekly, Oxford American, New York, Mojo, BBC Music Magazine, Stereo Review, Fi, and American Heritage.

Selected works

Books

As main author

As co- and contributing-author

Essays, articles

Journalism: print/online newspapers, magazines, and broadcasts

Liner notes

Family

Father: Herb Friedwald 
Will Friedwald is the son of the late Herb Friedwald (né Herbert F. Friedwald; 1935–1997) who was a jazz producer, jazz historian, and record label lawyer in New York. Herb was the founder of the short-lived jazz label, Kharma Records.  Among other pursuits, Herb wrote liner notes.

Selected liner notes of Herb Friedwald

References

Notes

Reviews of Friedwald's work

Inline citations

Other external links 
 Friedwald's YouTube channel
 Will Friedwald Interview NAMM Oral History Library (2021)

Living people
1961 births
American music critics
American music journalists
The New York Sun people
Historians of animation